Ron Burke may refer to:

 Ronald Burke (theologian) (1944–2002), American Roman Catholic theologian
 Ron Burke (sportscaster) (born 1963), American anchor/reporter and television personality
 Ronnie Burke  (1921–2003), British footballer